Meji Alabi (born 13 December 1988) is a London-born Nigerian filmmaker, director, photographer and producer. He is a director and has worked alongside Beyonce, Burna Boy, Wizkid,Davido, Tiwa Savage, Popcaan, Goldlink, Koffee and Nasty C.

Early life
Born on December 13, 1988, in London, Meji spent a lot of his childhood on the move with his father after his parents’ separation in 1989. He shuffled between London, the Bahamas, and Texas, USA. He attended Spring Forest middle school and Stratford High school both in Houston, Texas. Meji Alabi graduated from the University of West London with a first-class summa cum laude distinction in accounting and finance, and also holds a Licensed Vocational Nursing degree from St. Phillips College in San Antonio, Texas.

Career

In 2014, Meji Alabi co-founded JM Films with Jimi Adesanya. JM films ( a subsidiary of Unbound Studios) is a media and production services company specialised in creative visuals, music videos, commercials, movies and television and is based in Lagos, Nigeria. He is also a co-founder of Priorgold Pictures which is a  production outfit based in Lagos Nigeria, created to service the needs of the entertainment industry by providing equipment and personnel for the execution of creative visual content.

In 2014, he directed the music video for ‘Murda’ performed by Seyi Shay featuring Patoranking, Shaydee. The success of this video garnered him much attention in the Nigerian music industry and it was nominated in the same year at the MTV Africa Music Awards for Best Video. Also in 2014, he directed the music video for ‘Crazy’ performed by Seyi Shay featuring Wizkid and that video was nominated in 2015 for Best Music Video of the Year (Artist and Director) at the Nigeria Entertainment Awards and also Best Music Video at The Headies 2015.

In 2016, he directed the video for ‘Kontrol’ by Maleek Berry which marked a new wave of him directing music videos for the Nigerian music industry’s elite. In the same year, he directed ‘Aje’ performed by Alikiba which won the Best Music Video award at the Soundcity MVP Awards Festival in 2017.

In 2018, Meji directed the video for Davido’s single ‘Assurance’ off the ‘A Good Time’.

Since 2018, Meji Alabi has worked with Burna Boy on some of his projects. He directed Pull Up, On The Low, and Gum Body featuring Jorja Smith off Burna Boy's album ‘African Giant’. Meji also directed the videos for Way Too Big, Wonderful, Monsters You Made featuring Chris Martin and Real Life featuring Stormzy off the ‘Twice As Tall’ album.

Meji Alabi also worked with Wizkid on the Made in Lagos album, and holds directing credits for the music videos for Ginger featuring Burna Boy, No Stress and Smile featuring H.E.R

In 2020, Meji Alabi served as a producer alongside Jimi Adesanya for the Nigerian footage for the Black Is King visual project executively produced by Beyonce Knowles-Carter. He also worked alongside Ibra Ake and Jenn Nkiru to execute the Grammy Award-winning ‘Brown Skin Girl’ music video for which he was credited as co-director.

In 2021, Meji Alabi worked with Black Dog Films as director of the visual project for the ‘Zero Malaria: Draw The Line Against Malaria’ campaign. The movement features Nigerian actress and philanthropist Omotola Jalade-Ekeinde, actor and entrepreneur Osas Ighodaro, Kenyan Olympic Gold-medallist and marathon world record-holder Eliud Kipchoge, South African explorer and mountaineer Saray Khumalo, Nigerian artist Laolu Senbanjo current captain of the South Africa national Rugby team Siya Kolisi, and Rwandan-British choreographer Sherrie Silver.

Videography

Commercials

Awards and nominations

References

External links

1988 births
Living people
Nigerian film directors
Nigerian cinematographers
Nigerian music video directors